Andreas Steiner (born 23 August 1971) is a Swiss former footballer who played in the 1990s as midfielder.

Steiner played his youth football with FC Basel and joined their first team during their 1990–91 season under head-coach Ernst-August Künnecke. Steiner played his domestic league debut for the club in the last game of the season, an away game, on 12 June 1991 as Basel were defeated 1–2 by Étoile Carouge.

He stayed with the club for three seasons and during this time Steiner played a total of 21 games for Basel without scoring a goal. 12 of these games were in the Nationalliga A and nine were friendly games.

References

Sources
 
 Die ersten 125 Jahre. Publisher: Josef Zindel im Friedrich Reinhardt Verlag, Basel. 
 Verein "Basler Fussballarchiv" Homepage

FC Basel players
Swiss men's footballers
Association football midfielders
Swiss Super League players
Swiss Challenge League players
1971 births
Living people